The Clausthal University of Technology (also referred to as TU Clausthal or TUC) is an institute of technology (Technische Universität) in Clausthal-Zellerfeld, Lower Saxony, Germany. The small public university is regularly ranked among the Top German universities in engineering by CHE University Rankings. More than 30% of students and 20% of academic staff come from abroad, making it one of the most international universities in Germany. The university is best known for the prominent corporate leaders among its former students. In 2011, five of the 30 leading companies within the German stock index had alumni of TUC on their management board. Two of them as CEO.

History
The academy of the local Hanoverian mining authority was established in 1775 at Clausthal in the Harz mountain range with its centuries-long history of mining in the Upper Harz (most notably at the Rammelsberg). Initially a school for pitmen and smelter workers, it was raised to the status of a mining college by the Westphalian minister Count Hans von Bülow in 1810. In 1864, at the behest of King George V of Hanover, the spin-off of a mining academy (Bergakademie) was founded.

Both institutions remained under joint administration after the annexation of the Kingdom of Hanover by Prussia in 1866, until in 1906 the academy was separated as an autonomous educational establishment directly subordinate to the Prussian government represented by a curator. It was one of only two mining academies in Prussia, the other being the mining college in Berlin established in 1770, a predecessor of the Berlin Institute of Technology.

After World War II, the academy passed under the authority of the West German state of Lower Saxony, it was renamed Technische Hochschule in 1966 and Technische Universität in 1968. 

In 2015, student numbers at Clausthal reached a high of almost 5000 students. However, since then this number has rapidly plummeted to around 3400.

Organization 
 The Faculty of Natural and Materials Sciences
Institute of Inorganic and Analytical Chemistry
Institute of Materials Science and Engineering
Institute of Metallurgy
Institute of Non-Metallic Materials
Institute of Organic Chemistry
Institute of Physical Chemistry
Institute of Physics and Physical Technologies
Institute of Polymer Materials and Plastics Engineering
Institute of Technical Chemistry
Institute of Theoretical Physics
Laser Application Centre

 The Faculty of Energy and Economic Sciences
Institute of Electrical Power Engineering and Energy Systems
Institute of Energy Process Engineering and Fuel Technology
Institute of Environmental Sciences
Institute of Geology and Paleontology
Institute of Geophysics
Institute of Geotechnical Engineering and Mine Surveying
Institute of German and International Mining and Energy Law
Institute of Management and Economics
Institute of Mineral and Waste Processing, Waste Disposal and Geomechanics
Institute of Mineralogy and Mineral Resources
Institute of Mining
Institute of Subsurface Energy Systems

 The Faculty of Mathematics/Computer Sciences and Engineering
Institute of Applied Mechanics
Institute of Chemical and Electrochemical Process Engineering
Institute of Computer Sciences
Institute of Electrical Information Technology
Institute of Mass Transfer
Institute of Mathematics
Institute of Mechanical Engineering
Institute of Particle Technology
Institute of Plant Engineering and Fatigue Analysis
Institute of Process and Production Control Technology
Institute of Tribology and Energy Conversion Machinery
Institute of Welding and Machining

 The Interdisciplinary Research Facilities
Centre for Information Technology
Centre for Polymers
Centre for Simulation Technology
DFG Research Centre "Fertigen in Feinblech"
European Graduate School "Microstructural Control in Free-Radical Polymerization"
Forum Clausthal
Laser Application Centre

Reputation

Ranking 

 DIE ZEIT (CHE Ranking), 2012/2013: Top tier in Mechanical Engineering and Industrial Engineering.
The CHE-Ranking is the most comprehensive and most detailed university ranking in the German-speaking countries. It is published annually since 2005 by DIE ZEIT. 
Clausthal is placed regularly among the top universities in the majority of its engineering and sciences programs.

 WirtschaftsWoche, 2009: 5th among universities with the most alumni on the management boards of German corporate giants.
German business magazine WirtschaftsWoche researched the universities with the most alumni at the top of DAX-corporations.
Clausthal was placed 5th, however in relation to the size of the student body, TUC came in first.

 Junge Karriere, 2008: 8th in Industrial Engineering and 11th in Mechanical Engineering Junge Karriere, the career magazine of daily newspaper Handelsblatt conducted a ranking of German universities by interviewing over 51,000 students and graduates as well as over 1000 human resource managers. Handelsblatt is the largest newspaper on business and finance in Germany.

Unique features 

TU Clausthal consistently has a very high percentage of international students, ranging from 25 % to 38 % over the last decade.
The largest group of foreign nationals comes from the People's Republic of China (PRC), making up between 12 % and 20 % of total students.
TUC has the highest percentage of Chinese students in Germany.

The popularity of TUC among Chinese nationals is derived from its reputation as one of the three "ABC-Universities".
The abbreviation stands for Aachen, Berlin, and Clausthal and refers to RWTH Aachen, TU Berlin and TU Clausthal. In China, these three Universities are regarded as Germany's leading Universities of Technology.

Clausthal's reputation in China was further enhanced when former alumnus Wan Gang became the Chinese Minister for Science and Technology. Since 2007, Wan Gang coordinates the science and technology activities in all of China.

As a former mining academy, TU Clausthal is one of three universities in Germany (besides TU Freiberg and RWTH Aachen) that offers study programs in the fields of metals, mining, and petroleum engineering. In this regard, TUC was referred to as the "most renowned university for metallurgy" by Frankfurter Allgemeine Zeitung.

In relative terms, TU Clausthal is among the universities with the most alumni on the management boards of German blue chip corporations. Most recently, this included companies like RWE, ThyssenKrupp, K+S, HeidelbergCement, Aurubis, Eurasian Natural Resources Corporation and Jungheinrich.

Student Life

Big Band 

The "Big Band an der TU Clausthal e.V." was set up in the 2017/18 winter semester as a non-profit organization. The band was registered as a students' association at TU Clausthal. The 25 musicians are dedicated to jazz, swing, funk and pop music . Rehearsals of the "groovING TUC Big Band" named band are held every Friday during the whole year interrupted only by short summer and winter breaks. The band has own equipment like stage piano, piano, baritone saxophone, tenor saxophone, alto saxophone, bass trombone, tenor trombone, trumpet, flugelhorn, bass guitar with amplifier, electric guitars with amplifiers, electronic drum set, acoustic drum set, sound reinforcement system,  and music stands which can be used by foreign students, students without own musical instruments, and for gigs.

The band leader Domenic Eggers, who has a teaching assignment at TU Clausthal, rehearses with the band classical jazz as well as jazzy pop pieces. The program developed in the rehearsals is presented in a concert at the end of each semester, to which admission is free and where only donations for the band are requested.

Currently, about two-thirds of the band members are from the university (including students from abroad) and one-third are from the region.

In 2018 the Big Band set up a smaller ensemble, the swingING TUC Jazz Combo, of four to eight members of the Big Band playing in variable instrumentation. The Jazz Combo regularly practices its own literature, mainly blues but also pop songs, right before the Big Band rehearsal. The swingING TUC Jazz Combo had its first gig in October 2018 at a TU Clausthal event. Since that time it had several performances at regional events.

A vocal ensemble to support the band was also formed by the Big Band and has been rehearsing since March 2020 under the direction of jazz vocal teacher Chiara Raimondi until Chiara left the ensemble in summer 2021 for studying in Italy.

Notable faculty and alumni 
 Friedrich Adolph Roemer (1809–1869), geologist
 John O. Meusebach (1812–1897), bureaucrat, American farmer and politician
 Wilhelm Haarmann (1847–1931), chemist
 Arnold Sommerfeld (1868–1951), theoretical physicist
 Ernst Brandi (1875–1937), mining-engineer
 Sir Robert Nelson Kotze (1895), South African government mining engineer, knighted for services.
 Wilhelm Biltz (1877–1943), chemist
 Paul Ramdohr (1890–1985), mineralogist
 Josef Goubeau (1901–1990), chemist
 Paul Dahlke (1904–1984), actor
 Ekkehard Schulz (born 1941), businessman
 Wan Gang (born 1952), automotive engineer and politician
 Rudi Rubiandini (born 1962), former vice minister of energy and resource dept., indonesian petroleum professor, bureaucrat

See also 

 Technische Universität Bergakademie Freiberg
 Education in Germany

References

External links 

 Clausthal University of Technology Website

Clausthal University of Technology
Clausthal-Zellerfeld
Goslar (district)
Buildings and structures in the Harz
Educational institutions established in 1775
1775 establishments in the Holy Roman Empire